San Leonardo may refer to:

Leonard of Noblac (died 559), Frankish saint

Places in Italy
San Leonardo, Friuli, a comune in Friuli Venezia Giulia
San Leonardo, a former quarter of Milan, now within Gallaratese
San Leonardo (Milan Metro), a railway station
San Leonardo in Passiria or St. Leonhard in Passeier, a comune in South Tyrol

Churches
San Leonardo, Borgomanero, Piedmont
San Leonardo, Carmignano, Tuscany
San Leonardo, Matera, Basilicata
San Leonardo, Tapigliano, Piedmont
San Leonardo al Lago, Monteriggioni, Tuscany
San Leonardo da Porto Maurizio ad Acilia, Rome
San Leonardo in Arcetri, Florence
San Leonardo in Treponzio, Tuscany

Other places
San Leonardo, Nueva Ecija, a municipality in the Philippines
San Leonardo de Yagüe, a town and municipality in Soria, Spain
San Leonardo de Alba de Tormes, a former monastery in Salamanca, Spain

See also
 Saint Leonard (disambiguation)